Mo'en Mosavver or Mu‘in Musavvir (lit. Mo'en the painter) was a Persian miniaturist, one of the significant in 17th-century Safavid Iran. Not much is known about the personal life of Mo'en, except that he was born in ca. 1610-1615, became a pupil of Reza Abbasi, the leading painter of the day, and probably died in 1693. Over 300 miniatures and drawings attributed to him survive.  He was a conservative painter who partly reversed the advanced style of his master, avoiding influences from Western painting.  However, he painted a number of scenes of ordinary people, which are unusual in Persian painting.  

Muin was born in Isfahan and probably spent all of his life in this city. He enjoyed a long and successful career stretching from around 1630 to 1693.

Career 
He is notable as a master of illustration paintings especially figures, and compositions depicting banquet and battle scenes. He specialized in illuminated manuscripts and border decorations.

He illustrated animals and landscapes and other Aqa Mirak styles with significant virtuosity. He mostly used watercolor in his painting and remained faithful to the Isfahan school and Reza Abbasi. Other prominent painters influenced him, including Behzad, Mohammadi and Sadiqi Beg. He had several prominent pupils. Some of his manuscripts are signed by them. He was contemporary and friend of famous painters including Shafi' Abbasi.

Gallery

References

Artists from Isfahan
1610s births
1693 deaths
Persian miniature painters
17th-century painters of Safavid Iran
17th-century Iranian painters